Walter Lee Irvin (May 8, 1927 - February 16, 1969), a United States Army veteran of World War II, was one of the so-called Groveland Four—four young African-American men of Lake County, Florida who, in a racially charged case, were accused of raping and assaulting a white woman. Three of the young men were convicted: Irvin was sentenced to death, as was another of the defendants; the third, a minor, was sentenced to life in prison. The fourth had fled after being accused, but a few days later and 200 miles away, was found by a posse of 1,000 white men who, on July 26, 1949, shot him over 400 times while he was asleep under a tree.  No one was arrested for his murder.

Their conviction was overturned by the Supreme Court of the United States, but Irvin and another of the young men were shot by the Sheriff while being transported; only Irvin survived.  Irvin was tried and convicted a second time, his death sentence later commuted to life imprisonment, and he was eventually released only to be found dead a year later under questionable circumstances.

In 2016, all four were exonerated by the State of Florida. Their story is the subject of Gilbert King's winner of the 2013 Pulitzer Prize for General Nonfiction, "Devil in the Grove: Thurgood Marshall, the Groveland Boys, and the Dawn of a New America."

Background
Walter Lee Irvin was born May 8, 1927, in Gainesville, Florida to parents whose ancestors had been freed from slavery.  Irvin had served in the United States Army during World War II and returned home, where his family had independently established themselves in the black community of Groveland. Irvin was determined not to work in the orange groves for a white planter.

Events

In 1949, Irvin, Samuel Shepherd, and 16-year-old Charles Greenlee were accused of the alleged rape of a young white woman, Norma Padgett, and the alleged assault of her husband, Willie. Newspapers called them the Groveland Four or the Groveland Boys. The three were arrested, jailed in Groveland, Florida pending trial, and interrogated while being physically tortured. The fourth of the Groveland Four, Earnest Thomas, was hunted down by a posse 200 miles away and killed while purportedly attempting to escape.

Irvin was tried twice, the second time after the United States Supreme Court ordered a retrial. He was convicted both times and sentenced to death.

Orlando attorney, Franklin Williams, served for the defense. He was told by the surviving suspects that deputies had beaten them while making them stand on broken glass, hands tied to a pipe above their heads. Sheriff Willis V. McCall's deputies have been accused of manufacturing evidence in this case and others to win convictions. Irvin and another accused, Samuel Shepherd, were found guilty of rape and sentenced to death. Greenlee was also convicted but because of being a minor, he was sentenced to life in prison rather than to death.

In 1951, an NAACP legal team headed by Thurgood Marshall succeeded in getting the case overturned on appeal to the U.S. Supreme Court, which ordered a retrial because blacks had been improperly excluded from the jury. While transporting Shepherd and Irvin from state prison to county jail for retrial, Sheriff McCall shot them both while they were shackled to each other. The Sheriff claimed "that they jumped him in an escape attempt". Shepherd was declared dead on the scene. Irvin survived and accused the Sheriff of attempted murder in cold blood. The Sheriff was never indicted or suspended from office as a result of this incident.

After recovering from his wounds, Irvin was retried. Thurgood Marshall led the defense team, but Irvin was again found guilty and sentenced to death. In 1955, his sentence was commuted to life in prison by Florida governor LeRoy Collins, who had personally reviewed the case and was not convinced of his guilt.

Irvin was paroled in January 1968. In 1969, while visiting Lake County, he was found dead slumped over in his car. Officially his death was ruled to be of natural causes, although Marshall said he had doubts about the circumstances.

His military gravestone in Edgewood Cemetery in Groveland, Lake County, Florida reads, "WALTER L IRVIN, FLORIDA, PVT, 1447 SVC COMD UNIT, WORLD WAR II, MAY 8, 1927 - FEB 16, 1969".

References

External links
The Allen Platt case
Selections from the P.K. Yonge Library of Florida History
"A Southern sheriff's law and disorder" — St. Petersburg article
"Hitler is Here": Lynching in Florida During the Era of World War II [PDF]
Freedom Never Dies — PBS documentary

1927 births
1969 deaths
United States Army soldiers
People from Groveland, Florida